Une vie meilleure, also known  by its English release title A Better Life, is a 2011 French film directed by Cédric Kahn and starring Guillaume Canet, Leïla Bekhti and introducing Slimane Khettabi.

Plot
Yann (Guillaume Canet) and Nadia (Leïla Bekhti) fall in love. Nadia has acquired a crumbling building in a Paris suburb and the couple decide to renovate it to launch a restaurant. But things turn upside down, high financing costs make things difficult, and Nadia, has to accept a temporary work opportunity in Montreal to pitch in with extra money. She has to leave her son Slimane (Slimane Khettabi) to Yann. Things get even worse when Nadia disappears without a trace. Yann has to sell the building at a low price, not enough to pay all his debts, and has to move with Slimane from his nearby caravan to an unattractive room, which he rents from the buyer. He robs the man and travels with Slimane to Canada. He finds Nadia, she is in custody. He comes to the prison but at first she refuses to accept the visit. The next day she allows him to visit her but to Slimane's regret she refuses to see him, out of shame. She is there for drug possession, but she is innocent. The next time she allows Yann to visit her with Slimane.

Cast
Guillaume Canet : Yann
Leïla Bekhti : Nadia
Slimane Khettabi : Slimane
Brigitte Sy : The indebtedness volunteer
Arnaud Ducret : Nadia's boss

Awards and nominations
2011: Director Cédric Kahn nominated for "Tokyo Grand Prix" of the Tokyo International Film Festival
2011: Actor Guillaume Canet won "Best Actor Award" at the Rome Film Festival

References

External links

2011 films
2010s French-language films
2011 drama films
French drama films
Films directed by Cédric Kahn
2010s French films